Mike Hoffman (born September 20, 1980) is an American former professional ice hockey player. After leaving the University of Connecticut in 2003, he began his professional career with the Worcester IceCats of the American Hockey League (AHL) and the Peoria Rivermen of the ECHL. He signed a contract with the Toronto Maple Leafs in 2005, but he has never played in the National Hockey League.

During the 2010–11 and 2011–12 seasons, he played for the Belfast Giants of the Elite Ice Hockey League (EIHL) in Europe.

References

External links
 

1980 births
Living people
American men's ice hockey right wingers
Belfast Giants players
Chicago Steel players
Chicago Wolves players
Cleveland Barons (2001–2006) players
UConn Huskies men's ice hockey players
Florida Everblades players
Hartford Wolf Pack players
Ice hockey players from Massachusetts
Las Vegas Wranglers players
Manchester Monarchs (AHL) players
Peoria Rivermen (ECHL) players
Portland Pirates players
Toronto Marlies players
Worcester IceCats players
American expatriate ice hockey players in the Netherlands
American expatriate ice hockey players in Northern Ireland
American expatriate ice hockey players in Canada